The Fulton Elementary School (also known as Fulton Academy, and Pittsburgh Fulton PreK-5) in the Highland Park neighborhood of Pittsburgh, Pennsylvania, was built in 1894, and later added to in 1929. It was listed on the National Register of Historic Places in 1986.

References

School buildings on the National Register of Historic Places in Pennsylvania
Romanesque Revival architecture in Pennsylvania
Art Deco architecture in Pennsylvania
School buildings completed in 1894
Buildings and structures in Allegheny County, Pennsylvania
Pittsburgh History & Landmarks Foundation Historic Landmarks
National Register of Historic Places in Pittsburgh